Tom Kennedy is an American double-bass and electric bass player.

Tom Kennedy is the son of a professional trumpet player. He began playing acoustic bass at the age of nine on a double-bass brought home by his older brother, jazz pianist Ray Kennedy. Soon he began to perform with many nationally recognized artists passing through the Midwest.

Kennedy specialized in acoustic jazz until his introduction to the electric bass at the age of 17. Soon he was dividing his time between mainstream jazz and progressive jazz fusion. He moved to New York City in 1984.

Select discography

As leader
 Basses Loaded (TKM, 1996)
 Bassics (Victoria, 2002)
 Just for the Record (CD Baby, 2012)
 Just Play! (Capri, 2013)
 Points of View (TKM, 2017)
 Stories (Autumn Hill 2021)

As sideman
With Dave Weckl Band
 Rhythm of the Soul (1998) 
 Transition (2000)
 The Zone (2001)
 Perpetual Motion (2002)
 Live (And Very Plugged In) (2003)
 Synergy (2003) 
 Multiplicity (2005)
 Live in St. Louis at the Chesterfield Jazz Festival 2019 (2021)

With Bill Connors
 Step It (1984)
 Double Up (1986)
 Assembler (1987)

With others
 Hearts and Numbers by Don Grolnick
 I'll Remember April with Ray Kennedy
 The Infinite Desire by Al DiMeola
 Universe by Planet X
 Moonbabies by Planet X
 Inertia  by Derek Sherinian
 All Over the Place by Mike Stern
 Mike Stern Band: New Morning – The Paris Concert (DVD)

References

External links
 Official site

Living people
Musicians from St. Louis
American jazz double-bassists
Male double-bassists
American jazz bass guitarists
American male bass guitarists
Jazz fusion musicians
Guitarists from Missouri
20th-century American bass guitarists
Jazz musicians from Missouri
21st-century double-bassists
20th-century American male musicians
21st-century American male musicians
American male jazz musicians
Steps Ahead members
Year of birth missing (living people)